Martín Rodríguez (April 24, 1968 – October 12, 2020), better known by the ring name Espantito (Spanish for "Little Terror" or "Little Scare"), was a Mexican luchador enmascarado (or masked professional wrestler) working in the Mini-Estrella ("Mini-Star") division. Working in the Mini-Estrella division does not automatically mean that Espantito had dwarfism as several wrestlers who are just shorter in stature work in the "Mini" division. As a luchador enmascarado, Espantito's real name was not a matter of public record, but it was revealed upon his death in 2020.

Espantito made his professional wrestling debut in 1993 and was allowed to use a version of the Espanto mask and name with permission of the only surviving Espanto, Espanto III. He worked primarily on the Mexican independent circuit, but also worked for AAA, one of Mexico's largest professional wrestling promotions.

Personal life
Martín Rodríguez was born on April 25, 1968 in Torreón, Coahuila, Mexico. Growing up in Torreón he became a wrestling fan at a young age, often watching local wrestlers Espanto II and Espanto III wrestle in his hometown. In a 1999 interview he remarked that while his friends would cheer the técnicos (the faces, those that portray the "good guys") while he personally always favored the rudos (those that portray the bad guys, also known as "Heels"). While he wanted to become a luchador, it was hard for him to find a trainer willing to train someone of his diminutive stature, standing only  in his teens. His younger brother Raymundo also worked as a luchador, under the ring name Piratita Morgan.

He had two children with his wife and settled in City Heights, San Diego, where he owned a landscaping business. In September 2020, Rodríguez was admitted to Sharp Memorial Hospital, after being treated for pneumonia and then tested positive for COVID-19. He died on October 12, aged 52.

Classification as a Mini-Estrella
While the wrestler known as Espantito was known as a Mini-Estrella ("Mini-Star") it does not indicate that Espantito had Dwarfism.

Professional wrestling career
Due to the secretive culture around masked wrestlers in Lucha libre Espantito's real name was not a matter of common knowledge, nor has it been revealed if he worked under a different ring name before he made his in-ring debut as Espantito. It has been confirmed that Espantito trained in his native Torreón, Coahuila under the tutelage of Edgardo Cisneros Díaz, better known as Espanto II and also received further training from Indio Chirikawa. In the early 1990s the Mini-Estrella concept was introduced in Mexico, featuring not just midget wrestling but also wrestlers who were short in stature. A lot of these new Mini-Estrellas used the same ring character as regular sized wrestlers such as Octagoncito being a smaller version of Octagón. Due to his short stature, the future Espantito became a natural fit in the Mini-Estrellas division and was given permission by his trainer to start working as a smaller version of Los Espantos ("The Terrors") and became known as El Espantito, wearing the signature black mask with a white cross on it popularized by Espanto I, Espanto II and Espanto III as well as the same black-and-white ring gear of the originals. As Espantito he was one of the first competitors in the newly created Asistencia Asesoría y Administración's (AAA) Mini-Estrella division. Most of AAA's Mini-Estrella division consisted of luchadors that had followed AAA founder Antonio Peña from Consejo Mundial de Lucha Libre (CMLL), where some of the Mini-Estrellas changed their name and mask due to the larger version of the character not jumping to AAA at the time. One example was Super Muñequito, who was working as "Angelito Azteca" in CMLL, but had to change his name as Ángel Azteca did not leave CMLL. It has not been revealed if Espectrito also worked in the CMLL Mini-Estrella division at the time of the AAA exodus.

For a short while Espantito was teamed up with a wrestler working as "Espantito II", but Espantito II was only used for a few matches in 1993. Despite working for AAA for several years he never made an appearance on one of their major shows, despite the Mini-Estrella division being featured on several, even headlined some shows. In 1999 Espantito once again briefly teamed up with a wrestler working as "Espantito II", although it is unclear if it was the same worker under the mask than six years prior. By the late 1990s Espantito left AAA and began working primarily on the Mexican Independent circuit, often touring with a troupe of Mini-Estrellas such as Octagoncito, Piratita Morgan and Tzuki. The group toured the U.S., working for various National Wrestling Alliance (NWA) promotions as well as showcasing lucha libre and the Mini-Estrella style throughout the south-west. On September 20, 2009 Espantito wrestled Octagoncito for the vacant NWA World Midget's Championship on a Pro Wrestling Revolution (PWR) show, which saw Octagoncito win the match and the championship. The troupe of Mini-Estrellas would continue to use the NWA World Midget's Championship as part of their shows, promoting matches where Octagoncito would defend the championship against Espantito. Later on when Pro Wrestling Revolution split from the NWA the championship was re-branded the PWR World Midget's Championship, with Octagoncito defending it on occasion against Espectrito in various southern states of the United States.

Legal rights to the Espanto name
While several wrestlers have used the "Espanto" name over the years, El Hijo del Espanto I claims to currently have full rights to the use of the name "Espanto" in lucha libre, though his claim to the name does not seem all-inclusive as CMLL has Espanto Jr. on their roster. It is unclear if Espantito legally owned the name, or if that was what prevented the "Espantito II" name from being used more than once or twice.

References

1968 births
2020 deaths
Masked wrestlers
Mexican male professional wrestlers
Mini-Estrella wrestlers
Professional wrestlers from Coahuila
People from Torreón